Nathan Cole (July 26, 1825March 4, 1904) was a nineteenth-century politician, merchant and businessman from Missouri.

Biography
Born in St. Louis, Missouri, Cole attended common schools as a child and later took a partial course at Shurtleff College. He engaged in mercantile pursuits in St. Louis, was a director of the Bank of Commerce for forty-three years, most of which time he was also vice president of the bank, and was a director in a number of insurance and other corporations. Cole served as Mayor of St. Louis, Missouri from 1869 to 1871, was president of the Merchants' Exchange in 1876 and was elected a Republican to the United States House of Representatives in 1876, serving from 1877 to 1879, being unsuccessful for re-election in 1878. Afterward, he resumed his former business activities in St. Louis until his death there on March 4, 1904. He was interred in Bellefontaine Cemetery in St. Louis.

His son, Nathan Cole Jr., was one of the founders of the Los Angeles Times, in 1881.

References

External links

St. Louis Mayors: an Online Exhibit

1825 births
1904 deaths
Mayors of St. Louis
Burials at Bellefontaine Cemetery
Republican Party members of the United States House of Representatives from Missouri
19th-century American politicians
19th-century American businesspeople